Samad Allapitchay (born 1950) is a former Singapore national football team captain who played for National Football League sides Geylang International and Tampines Rovers, and the Singapore Lions in the Malaysia Cup as a centre-back.

Samad was known as a hard-tackling, no-nonsense defender with a penchant for bulldozing his way from defence to attack. He was once dubbed "The Rock of Gilbratar" by his national team coach Mick Walker.

Personal life

Samad is married to Norizan Aljunied. His youngest son is Tampines Rovers and Singapore international defender Shariff Samat.

Honours

Club
Singapore Lions
Malaysia Cup: 1977, 1980

References

Living people
1950 births
Association football defenders
Singaporean footballers
Singapore international footballers
Singapore FA players
Geylang International FC players
Tampines Rovers FC players